Events in the year 2014 in Gabon.

Incumbents 

 President: Ali Bongo Ondimba
 Prime Minister: Raymond Ndong Sima (until 27 January), Daniel Ona Ondo (from 27 January)

Events 

 16–28 August – The country competed at the 2014 Summer Youth Olympics, in Nanjing, China.

Deaths

References 

 
2010s in Gabon
Years of the 21st century in Gabon
Gabon